Gerd Schwandner (born 22 May 1951) is a German surgeon and former politician. He was mayor of Oldenburg from 2006 to 2014.

Background and education 
Schwandner was born  in Göppingen, Baden Württemberg, and studied medicine in Düsseldorf and Heidelberg. From 1977 to 1984 he worked at the university hospital of Heidelberg and later in Pforzheim.

Politics 
At first Schwandner was a member of the liberal FDP. He left the party to join the Greens in the 1980s. In 1984 he became member of the Landtag of Baden-Würrtemberg. Eventually Schwandner was appointed deputy leader of his political group in parliament, serving for six years in this office. After he was reelected in 1988, he moved to the city of Bremen in 1992, where he became council of state. He left the Greens in 2005.

Mayor of Oldenburg 
During the 2006 lord mayor elections in Oldenburg, Schwandner, now independent, was candidate of the center-right CDU. He won the election, defeating incumbent mayor Dietmar Schütz (SPD). Schwandner was mayor of Oldenburg until 2014.

References 

Oldenburgs OB wackelt. Die Karriere eines BlendersKoalition in Oldenburg: Schwarz-Grüner Albtraum an der Hunte

1951 births
Living people
People from Göppingen
21st-century German politicians
Christian Democratic Union of Germany politicians
Mayors of places in Lower Saxony
Heidelberg University alumni